Urgand is a village in Badakhshan Province in north-eastern Afghanistan.

See also
Badakhshan Province

References

External links 
Satellite map at Maplandia.com 

Populated places in Badakhshan Province